Barremites is an ammonoid cephalopod genus belonging to the family Desmoceratidae, that lived during the Hauterivian and Barremian stages of the Early Cretaceous.

Description 

Its shell is moderately to very involute, with the outer whorl strongly embracing the inner whorls, and variably compressed. Sides are generally smooth and marked with sinuous or falcate collars marking intervals of growth and bearing feeble striae to moderately distinguished ribs.

Two subgenera have been defined; Barremites (Raspailiceras) which is moderately involute with a well rounded whorl section and sloping umbilical walls, from the Hauterivian and Barremian, and Barremites (Barremites) which is very involute, compressed, high whorled, with a steep umbilical wall bordered by a sharp edge, from the Barremian.

Barremites has a wide distribution and has been found throughout Europe, in the Republic of Georgia, Morocco, Mexico, Columbia, and Japan.

Distribution
Cretaceous of Austria, Bulgaria, Czech Republic,  France, Hungary, Italy, Japan, Morocco, Slovakia, Spain, Trinidad and Tobago and the former USSR.

References

Bibliography

External links 
 
 

Cretaceous ammonites
Barremian life
Hauterivian life
Ammonites of Africa
Cretaceous Morocco
Fossils of Morocco
Ammonites of Asia
Fossils of Japan
Early Cretaceous ammonites of Europe
Cretaceous France
Fossils of France
Cretaceous Italy
Fossils of Italy
Fossils of Slovakia
Cretaceous Spain
Fossils of Spain
Early Cretaceous ammonites of North America
Cretaceous California
Fossils of the United States
Cretaceous Mexico
Fossils of Mexico
Ammonites of South America
Cretaceous Colombia
Fossils of Colombia
Ammonites of Europe